Haewon is one of the main teachings of Jeung San Do. Hae (解) means "release" or "solve" and won (怨) means "grudge" or "grief". Therefore, a literal meaning of haewon is resolution of bitterness and grief.

Teachings of Haewon
Throughout the ages, humans have suffered in the context of mutual conflict, and after death they have entered the spirit world, bearing bitterness and grief. Their bitterness and grief has accumulated over time and has turned into lethal energy.

Not all people are truly satisfied with their lives and live without bitterness and grief. Because of this bitterness and grief, people suffer and eventually they have grudge feeling toward each other. Therefore, more conflict and more lethal energy generated.

This lethal energy is the destructive force behind misfortune and disaster. No one in the world ever tried to resolve the bitterness and grief, except Jeung San Sangjenim. Many sages, saints, and holymen attempted to resolve the bitterness and grief, but unable to accomplish this work.

Resolving the bitterness and grief of spirits was a central focus of the spiritual work of Jeung San Sangjenim. Those who practice Jeung San Do are encouraged to refrain from harboring grudges or feelings of enmity and to avoid causing bitterness within others.

Quotes from the Dojeon
The bitterness and grief of one person is enough to block the flow of qi in heaven and earth.
Dojeon 2:52:1

Reflect on your own shortcomings first, and do not harbor feelings of enmity. Leave the rest to the spirits.
Dojeon 11:42:2

See also
 Boeun (Offering Gratitude and Repayment) 報恩
 Cosmic Year
 Shao Yung
 Dojang Dao center 道場
 Dojeon Sacred text of Jeung San Do 道典
 Gaebyeok 
 Jeung San Do
 Sangjenim 上帝
 Sangsaeng (Mutual life-giving) 相生
 Tae Eul Ju mantra 太乙呪
 Taemonim 太母
 Wonsibanbon (Returning to the Origin) 原始反本

References

Jeung San Do